South Carolina Highway 903 (SC 903) is a  primary state highway in the U.S. state of South Carolina. It connects Lancaster to Darlington, Florence, and the Grand Strand.

Route description

SC 903 is a two-lane rural highway, from Catarrh to Lancaster.  Control cities listed southbound include Myrtle Beach.

History
Established either in 1929 or 1930 as a new primary routing, it traversed from SC 35 in Catarrh to SC 9 in Midway.  In 1949, SC 903 was extended north to its current northern terminus in Lancaster, replacing an old alignment of SC 9.

Major intersections

See also

References

External links

SC 903 at Virginia Highways' South Carolina Highways Annex

903
Transportation in Chesterfield County, South Carolina
Transportation in Kershaw County, South Carolina
Transportation in Lancaster County, South Carolina